Before You Were Punk is a compilation album released in 1997 by Vagrant Records.  It consists of a number of mid-1990s punk rock bands (most of them from southern California) covering songs that were popularised during the 1980s "new wave" musical movement.  It was an ambitious release for the label, which was still in its early stages, and proved to be a success by selling over 70,000 copies.  It was followed by an equally successful sequel, Before You Were Punk 2, in 1999.

Because Vagrant Records did not yet have an extensive roster of artists, the compilation relied mostly on contributions from bands on other record labels.  Only Face to Face and Automatic 7 had previously released records through Vagrant.  By contrast, Before You Were Punk 2 would feature more bands that had signed to the label between 1997 and 1999.

Track listing

Album information
 Record label: Vagrant Records
 Art direction by Andrew Lenoski, Rich Egan and Jon Cohen
 Recording and mixing:
 Tracks 1 and 2 recorded and mixed by Ryan Greene at Razor's Edge Studios in San Francisco, California
 Track 3 recorded and mixed by Ryan Greene at Razor's Edge Studios in San Francisco, California
 Tracks 4, 5, 7, 9, and 11 recorded and mixed by Kiley and Dan at Doghouse Studios in Van Nuys, California
 Track 6 recorded and mixed by Scott Axum and Don Lithgow at DML Studios.
 Track 8 recorded and mixed by Kevin Army at Roof Bros. Studios in Oakland, California
 Track 10 recorded and mixed by Jeff Bridges at Big Noise Studios
 Track 12 recorded and mixed by Jowe Marquez at Prairie Sun Studios
 Horns on track 6 performed by Buck-O-Nine horn section

References 

1997 compilation albums
Punk rock compilation albums
New wave compilation albums
Covers albums